The Maîtrise de la Cathédrale Saint-Étienne de Toulouse is a boys choir of several centuries of existence refounded in 1936 in Toulouse by George Rey. They have also been known by the name of Petits Chanteurs à la Croix Potencée. Today, the Maîtrise de la Cathédrale is composed by a boys choir (ages 8 to 25), a girls choir and more than eight children choirs.

List of conductors since 1936

 Abbé Georges Rey (1936–1976)
 Denis Dupays (1977–1979)
 Michel Rivière des Borderies (1980–1987)
 Yves Lequin (1987–1989)
 François Terrieux (1989–1990)
 David Godfroid (1990–1998)
 Wilfried Busaall (1999–2003)
 Bertrand Ollé (2003–2004)
 Victoria Digon (2004–2007)
 Peggy Pehau (2007–2009)
 Luciano Bibiloni (depuis 2009)

External links 
 Official website of the Maîtrise de la Cathédrale Saint-Étienne

French choirs
Organizations based in Toulouse
Musical groups established in 1936
Musical groups from Occitania (administrative region)
Christianity in Toulouse